Scaeva is a genus of hoverflies.  The taxonomy of the genus, and the related genera Simosyrphus and Ischiodon has been discussed by Láska et al. (2006)

Biology

 Scaeva albomaculata (Macquart, 1842)
Scaeva dignota (Rondani, 1857)
Scaeva latimaculata (Brunetti, 1923)
Scaeva mecogramma (Bigot, 1860)
Scaeva pyrastri (Linnaeus, 1758)
Scaeva selenitica (Meigen, 1822)

References

External links
 

Diptera of Europe
Diptera of North America
Syrphinae
Syrphini
Hoverfly genera
Taxa named by Johan Christian Fabricius